Under the Public Health Acts 1873 and 1875 the Poor Law Unions were used as the basis for sanitary districts. All municipal boroughs and areas with bodies such as improvement commissioners became Urban Sanitary Districts. (Any area which acquired borough or urban status after the Act also became at that point an Urban Sanitary District). The remaining areas of the country - i.e., the Unions minus the urban areas - became Rural Sanitary Districts.

Under the Local Government Act 1894 the Urban and Rural Sanitary Districts in Dorset were succeeded by Urban Districts and Rural Districts.

Sanitary districts in Dorset between 1875 and 1894

RSD - Rural Sanitary District
USD - Urban Sanitary District

Axminster RSD
In Devon but also covered the following parishes, then in Dorset:
Chardstock
Hawkchurch

Beaminster RSD
Dorset:
Beaminster, Bettiscombe, Broadwindsor, Burstock
Chedington, Corscombe
East Chelborough, Evershot
Halstock, Hooke
Mapperton, Marshwood, Melbury Osmond, Melbury Sampford, Mosterton
Netherbury, North Poorton
Pilsdon, Powerstock
Rampisham
South Perrott, Stoke Abbott
West Chelborough, Wraxall
Somerset:
Misterton
Seaborough

Blandford RSD
Almer, Anderson
Blandford Forum, Blandford St Mary, Bryanston (parts only)
Charlton Marshall
Durweston
Hilton
Iwerne Courtney, Iwerne Stepleton
Langton Long Blandford
Milborne St Andrew, Milborne Stileham, Milton Abbas
Pimperne
Spetisbury, Stourpaine
Tarrant Crawford, Tarrant Gunville, Tarrant Hinton, Tarrant Keyneston, Tarrant Launceston, Tarrant Monkton, Tarrant Rawston, Tarrant Rushton, Turnworth
Winterborne Clenston, Winterborne Houghton, Winterborne Kingston, Winterborne Stickland, Winterborne Tomson, Winterborne Whitchurch, Winterborne Zelston

Blandford Forum USD
parts of Blandford Forum, Blandford St Mary and Bryanston

Bridport RSD
Allington (part), Askerswell
parts of Bothenhampton, Bradpole and Burton Bradstock
Catherston Leweston, Chideock, Chilcombe
Litton Cheney, Loders
Puncknowle
Shipton Gorge, Stanton St Gabriel, Swyre, Symondsbury (part)
Walditch (part), Whitchurch Canonicorum, Wootton Fitzpaine

Bridport USD
Bridport
parts of Allington, Bothenhampton, Bradpole, Burton Bradstock, Symondsbury and Walditch

Cerne RSD
Alton Pancras
Batcombe, Buckland Newton
Cattistock, Cerne Abbas, Cheselbourne, West Compton
Frome St Quintin
Glanvilles Wootton, Godmanstone, Gorewood
Hermitage, Hilfield
Mappowder, Melbury Bubb, Melcombe Horsey, Minterne Magna
Nether Cerne
Piddletrenthide, Pulham
Sydling St Nicholas
Up Cerne

Chard RSD
In Somerset but also covered the following parish, at that time in Dorset:
Wambrook

Dorchester RSD
Athelhampton
Bradford Peverell, Broadmayne, Burleston
Charminster, Chilfrome, Compton Valence
Dewlish, Dorchester (Holy Trinity) (part)
Fordington (part), Frampton, Frome Vauchurch
Kingston Russell
Littlebredy, Long Bredy
Maiden Newton
Piddlehinton, Puddletown
Stinsford, Stratton
Tincleton, Toller Fratrum, Toller Porcorum, Tolpuddle
Warmwell, Watercombe, West Knighton, West Stafford, Whitcombe, Winterborne Came, Winterborne Herringstone, Winterborne Monkton, Winterborne St Martin, Winterbourne Abbas, Winterbourne Steepleton, Woodsford, Wynford Eagle

Dorchester USD
Dorchester (All Saints, St Peter; part of Holy Trinity)
part of Fordington

Kinson USD
part of Kinson (1892–94)

Lyme Regis USD
Lyme Regis

Mere RSD
In Wiltshire but also covered the following Dorset parishes:
Bourton; Silton

Poole RSD
Canford Magna
Kinson (entire to 1892; part from 1892 to 1894)
Lytchett Matravers, Lytchett Minster

Poole USD
Hamworthy
Longfleet
Parkstone, Poole (Poole St James)

Portland USD
Portland

Shaftesbury RSD
Ashmore
Cann, Compton Abbas
East Orchard, East Stour
Fontmell Magna
Gillingham
Iwerne Minster
Margaret Marsh, Melbury Abbas, Motcombe
parts of Shaftesbury (Holy Trinity, St James, St Peter); Stour Provost, Sutton Waldron
Todber
West Orchard, West Stour

Shaftesbury USD
parts of Shaftesbury (Holy Trinity, St James, St Peter)

Sherborne RSD
Dorset:
Beer Hackett, Bishops Caundle, Bradford Abbas
Castleton (part), Caundle Marsh, Chetnole, Clifton Maybank
Folke
Haydon, Holnest, Holwell
Leigh, Leweston, Lillington, Longburton
Nether Compton, North Wootton
Oborne, Over Compton
Purse Caundle
Ryme Intrinseca
Sherborne (part), Stockwood
Thornford
Yetminster
Somerset:
Goathill, Marston Magna, Poyntington, Rimpton, Sandford Orcas, Trent

Sherborne USD
part of Castleton
part of Sherborne

Sturminster RSD
Belchalwell (divided between Fifehead Neville and Okeford Fitzpaine 1884)
Child Okeford
Fifehead Magdalen, Fifehead Neville
Hammoon, Hanford, Hazelbury Bryan, Hinton St Mary
Ibberton
Lydlinch
Manston, Marnhull
Okeford Fitzpaine
Shillingstone, Stalbridge, Stock Gaylard, Stoke Wake, Stourton Caundle, Sturminster Newton
Woolland

Swanage USD
Swanage

Wareham and Purbeck RSD
Affpuddle, Arne
Bere Regis, Bloxworth
Chaldon Herring, Church Knowle, Coombe Keynes, Corfe Castle
East Holme, East Lulworth, East Stoke
Kimmeridge
Langton Matravers
Morden, Moreton
Steeple, Studland
Turners Puddle, Tyneham
Wareham (Holy Trinity and St Martin - part; Lady St Mary - part 1875-86; entire 1886-94), West Lulworth, Winfrith Newburgh, Wool, Worth Matravers

Wareham USD
Wareham Holy Trinity (part); Lady St Mary (part 1875-86; entire 1886-94); St Martin (part)

Weymouth RSD
Abbotsbury
Bincombe, Broadwey, Buckland Ripers
Fleet
Langton Herring
Osmington, Owermoigne
Portesham, Preston, Poxwell
Radipole (part)
Upwey
West Chickerell, Wyke Regis (part)

Weymouth and Melcombe Regis USD
Melcombe Regis
Radipole (part)
Weymouth, Wyke Regis (part)

Wimborne and Cranborne RSD
Chalbury, Chettle, Corfe Mullen, Cranborne
East Woodyates, Edmondsham
Farnham (moved to Blandford PLU 1894)
Gussage All Saints, Gussage St Michael
Hampreston, Hinton Martell, Hinton ParvaHorton
Long Crichel
Moor Crichel
Pentridge
Shapwick, Sixpenny Handley, Sturminster Marshall
Tollard Royal
West Parley, West Woodyates, Wimborne Minster (entire to 1892; part from 1892 to 1894), Wimborne St Giles, Witchampton, Woodlands

Wimborne Minster USD
part of Wimborne Minster (1892–94)

Wincanton RSD
In Somerset but covered the following Dorset parishes:
Buckhorn Weston; Kington Magna

L
Sanitary districts
Dorset